Christmas Favorites (2012) is an EP album introduced for digital distribution by Sara Niemietz.

2012 was Sara Niemietz' third year for publishing traditional Christmas song covers, teaming with Randy Kerber on "All I Want for Christmas Is You" (Vince Vance & The Valiants) in 2010.  In 2011, a various-artists, compilation album was released on YouTube and iTunes (A YouTube Christmas) with Niemietz and Kerber performing Bing Crosby's, 1943 top ten hit, "I'll Be Home for Christmas".

Background 

Christmas Favorites was recorded at Taylor Made Studios and co-produced by Emmy Award winner W. G. Snuffy Walden.  Walden accompanies Niemietz on guitar with Oscar and Grammy nominated, Randy Kerber accompanying on piano.  Andrew Shulman, former principal cellist of the Philharmonia Orchestra, plays cello with eight time BMI TV Music Award winner, Bennett Salvay, arranging for cello. Veteran studio musician, George Doering, accompanies on guitar, electric guitar, bass and drums.
 
In addition to Christmas Favorites, Niemietz is featured on Richard Marx' 2012, Christmas album entitled, Christmas Spirit.  With featured artists Sara Niemietz, Kenny Loggins and Sara Watkins, Marx' Christmas Spirit made the end of year Billboard Magazine charts for The Billboard 200 at #181, Top Holiday Albums at #21 and Top Independent Albums at #10.

Artists 

"This Christmas"
 Sara Niemietz - vocals
 W.G. Snuffy Walden - guitar and bowed guitar
 George Doering - various percussion

"The Christmas Song"
 Sara Niemietz - vocals
 Randy Kerber - piano

"Winter Wonderland"
 Sara Niemietz - vocals, sleigh bells
 George Doering - guitar, bass, drums

O Holy Night
 Sara Niemietz - vocals
 George Doering - guitar

"Mary, Did You Know"
 Sara Niemietz - vocals:
 Andrew Shulman - cello
 Bennett Salvay - cello arrangement
 W.G. Snuffy Walden - nylon guitar
 George Doering - electric guitar

"Silent Night"
 Sara Niemietz - vocals
 vocal arrangement - 
 Sara Niemietz
 W.G. Snuffy Walden
 Randy Kerber

Track listing

References

External links 
 SaraNiemietz.com
 
 

2012 EPs
Sara Niemietz EPs